Severiana is a genus of cicadas in the family Cicadidae. There are at least three described species in Severiana.

Species
These three species belong to the genus Severiana:
 Severiana magna Villet, 1999 c g
 Severiana severini (Distant, 1893) c g
 Severiana similis (Schumacher, 1913) c g
Data sources: i = ITIS, c = Catalogue of Life, g = GBIF, b = Bugguide.net

References

Further reading

 
 
 
 

Cicadidae genera
Platypleurini